Smoke is a 1995 American independent film by Wayne Wang and Paul Auster. The original story was written by Paul Auster, who also wrote the screenplay. The film was produced by Greg Johnson, Peter Newman, Kenzo Horikoshi, and Hisami Kuroiwa. Among others, it features Harvey Keitel, William Hurt, Stockard Channing, Harold Perrineau Jr., Giancarlo Esposito, Ashley Judd, and Forest Whitaker.

Plot
The film follows the lives of multiple characters, all of whom are connected via their patronage of a small Brooklyn tobacconist store managed by Auggie. Brooklyn Cigar Co. was located on the corner of 16th Street and Prospect Park West.

Auggie has been taking photographs of the store from across the street at 8:00am every morning and has been collecting all his photos in albums. A recently-widowed writer Paul Benjamin  spends an evening with Auggie, during which Auggie tells Paul of his photographs, which he describes as his "life's work".  Auggie asks Paul to look through the photographs, which are collected in a large number of albums. At first, Paul does not take the photographs seriously, saying that "they're all the same". Auggie says that they only look the same superficially, but they are all different, with each photo representing a unique moment in time.  Auggie implores Paul to "slow down", which Paul agrees to do.  Paul sees his wife in one of the pictures, and breaks down.

The next day, Paul is lost in thought as he crosses the road and is saved from being run down by a truck by a young black man named Rashid, whom he invites to stay in his apartment as a form of thanks.  Rashid accepts, but irritates Paul by making noise, and breaking dishes, while Paul is writing. Paul asks Rashid to leave, which he does.  Paul is visited by Rashid's aunt, who aggressively demands to know why Rashid has been staying with Paul.  She reveals that Rashid's name is in fact Thomas, and that he is from an underprivileged background.  She also says that Rashid has been estranged from his father since childhood, and that his father had been spotted recently at a gas station outside the city.

Rashid tracks down his father, Cyrus Cole, to a small-town gas station, which he sketches. Cyrus, not recognising him, befriends him and hires Rashid to carry out renovation work at his gas station.  Rashid conceals his identity and tells Cyrus that his name is Paul Benjamin.  His father has an artificial arm, which he tells Rashid was the result of a car accident in which his then wife (who was in fact Rashid's mother) was killed.  Cyrus says that he was driving drunk and that his artificial arm was a way for God to remind him to better himself.  Rashid leaves the station, without any notice.

Rashid returns to Paul's apartment to give him a second hand television as a gift.  As Rashid tries to leave, Paul forces him to stay and to call his aunt to reassure her that he is safe.  Paul finds $5,000 that Rashid has stashed in the apartment.  Paul confronts Rashid about the money, and Rashid reveals that he took the money from the robbers as he fled, which is why he is in hiding.  Paul implores Rashid to return the money but Rashid refuses.  Rashid disappears one day, without explaining where he has gone.

Paul and Auggie track Rashid down.  Paul introduces himself to Rashid's father, who comments that Rashid and he share a name. Rashid confesses that his real name is Thomas Jefferson Cole.  His father finally understands that Rashid is in fact his son, but reacts by rejecting him violently.  After an emotional breakdown, they reconcile.

Rashid is hired to work at the tobacconist.  Auggie imports a box of Cuban cigars that he intends to sell to public officials in the city.  Auggie has spent $5,000 on the shipment, the entirety of his savings.  Rashid ruins the cigars when he is left to look after the shop on his own by allowing the sink to overflow. He gives Auggie the $5000 to keep his job.  Auggie initially refuses but eventually agrees to keep the money.

Auggie's old girlfriend Ruby McNutt visits him in the tobacconist.  Ruby asks Auggie for money to cover rehab costs for Felicity, whom she says is his daughter and who is pregnant on drugs.  Auggie later gives her the same $5000 that was given to him by Rashid.  Auggie asks Ruby if Felicity really is his daughter, to which he receives an ambiguous response.

Paul tells Auggie that he has been asked by the New York Times to write a Christmas story to be published on Christmas day.  After Paul says that he does not have any ideas, Auggie offers to tell him the best Christmas story he has ever heard in exchange for lunch.  Auggie tells Paul a tender story about spending Christmas with a blind grandmother who at first thinks, and then pretends, he is her grandson. After the grandmother falls asleep, Auggie finds stacks of stolen cameras in the bathroom and decides to take one for himself.  Weeks later, he regrets his decision to take the camera, and decides to return but then finds that the grandmother had died in the meantime, meaning that she had spent her last Christmas with him.  The story is based on writer Paul Auster's piece "Auggie Wren's Christmas Story", published in The New York Times on Christmas day, 1990. Paul is impressed by the story, and thanks Auggie for it.  The exchange ends ambiguously, with Paul suggesting that he suspects that Auggie has in fact invented and perhaps even improvised the whole story, and Auggie suggesting that Paul's understanding is correct, without actually confirming that to be the case.

During and after the closing credits, Auggie's story is enacted in a poignant black-and-white sequence to the soundtrack of Tom Waits's Innocent When You Dream.

Cast
 William Hurt as Paul Benjamin
 Harvey Keitel as Augustus "Auggie" Wren
 Stockard Channing as Ruby McNutt
 Harold Perrineau as Thomas "Rashid" Cole (as Harold Perrineau Jr.)
 Jared Harris as Jimmy Rose
 Giancarlo Esposito as Tommy Finelli, OTB Man #1
 José Zúñiga as Jerry, OTB Man #2
 Ashley Judd as Felicity
 Forest Whitaker as Cyrus Cole
 Malik Yoba as The Creeper
 Victor Argo as Vinnie
 Daniel Auster as Book Thief
 Deirdre O'Connell as Sue, The Waitress
 Michelle Hurst as Aunt Em
 Erica Gimpel as Doreen Cole
 Mary B. Ward	as April Lee
 Clarice Taylor as Grandma Ethel

Reception
On Rotten Tomatoes the film has a rating of 88% based on 32 reviews. The consensus summarizes: "Smoke draws in a stellar ensemble, holds the audience's attention with a robust blend of connected stories, and sends viewers out on a pleasurable high."

It opened on 4 screens (including two in New York and one in Los Angeles) and grossed $70,744 for the weekend, being the number one exclusive release in New York and L.A. It went on to gross $8 million in the United States and Canada and $30 million internationally.

Awards
Won
 Silver Bear (Wayne Wang) 45th Berlin International Film Festival, 1995
 Danish Film Critics Bodil Award for Best American Film, 1995
 German Film Award for Best Foreign Film, 1995
 MTV Movie Award for Best Sandwich in a Movie - Ham and Cheese Sandwich
 Independent Spirit Award for Best First Screenplay (Paul Auster), 1995

Nominated
 Stockard Channing - Best Supporting Actress - Screen Actors Guild

Sequel
The film was followed by Blue in the Face, a sequel of sorts that continues following a few of the characters and introduces several new ones.

Legacy
The character Augustus "Auggie" Wren (played by Harvey Keitel) is modelled after the real-life owner of Augie's Jazz Bar, which closed in 1998. When the establishment reopened in 1999, the new owners could not keep the former establishment's name. To honor its legacy, they named the new club after the 1995 film. 

A VHS copy of the film can be seen on top of the television set during the house party finale of the 1996 horror movie Scream.

References

External links
 
 
 Smoke Jazz & Supper Club-Lounge

1995 films
American drama films
1995 drama films
Films set in New York City
American independent films
1995 independent films
Films set in Brooklyn
Films about smoking
Films directed by Wayne Wang
Films directed by Paul Auster
Films with screenplays by Paul Auster
Films scored by Rachel Portman
Silver Bear Grand Jury Prize winners
1990s English-language films
1990s American films